Barry Morishita is a Canadian politician currently serving as the leader of the Alberta Party since 2021. He previously served on the city council of Brooks in 1998 and became the city's mayor in 2016.

Background 

Morishita's father, born in 1945 in Tashme Internment Camp, moved to Brooks in the end of World War Two where Barry would eventually be born.

He graduated Rosemary High School in 1983.

In 1986, he married his wife, Jeanne.

Before his entry into politics he owned and operated an auto part store along with some business partners.

Political career 
Morishita was first elected in Brooks city council in 1998 at the age of thirty. He was elected Mayor of Brooks in 2016  and president of the Alberta Urban Municipalities Association in 2017. In September 2021, he stepped down from both roles to become leader of the Alberta Party after the resignation of former party leader Stephen Mandel. He ran in a by-election for the southern Alberta seat of Brooks-Medicine Hat on November 8, 2022 but lost to the UCP candidate, Alberta premier Danielle Smith.

Electoral record

References 

1966 births
Alberta Party politicians
People from Brooks, Alberta
Mayors of places in Alberta
Alberta municipal councillors
Canadian politicians of Japanese descent
21st-century Canadian politicians
Living people